Iwamoto may refer to:

Iwa Moto, Filipina actress and model
Iwamoto (surname), a Japanese surname
C/2018 Y1 (Iwamoto), a comet discovered in 2018, named after the astronomer